Noah Holcomb (born July 9, 1983 in Sioux City, Iowa, US) is a retired American professional mountain biker. Holcomb is also a 2008 and 2009 California State Champion in the discipline of Cyclocross. He last rode for the professional mountain bike team Cannondale Factory Racing, and currently resides in Laguna Beach, California, US.

Results and rankings 

2007
Fontana NMBS - 59th, Pro XC
Fontana NMBS - 59th, Pro XC
California State Cyclocross Series - 1st, Pro SS
California Urban Cyclocross Series - 1st, Pro SS

2008
Rim Nordic #3/So Cal State Event #6 - 3rd, Pro SS/XC
Santa Ynez Valley National-NMBS #3 - 2nd, Pro SS/XC
Santa Ynez Valley National-NMBS #3 - 7th, Pro Super-D
Santa Ynez Valley National-NMBS #3 - 30th, Pro STXC
Fontana National Presented by MAXXIS NMBS#1 - 71st, Pro STXC
California Prestige Series of Cyclocross - 1st, 1/2/3 SS
California State Cyclocross Championships - 1st, 1/2/3 SS

2009
California State Cyclocross Championships - 1st, 1/2/3 SS
California Prestige Series of Cyclocross - 1st, 1/2/3 SS
Urban Cyclocross Series - 1st overall, 1/2/3 SS
AMBC Idyllwild Challenge - 19th, Pro XC
US Cup #5 - Santa Ynez -  21st, Pro XC
US PROXCT - Sea Otter Classic - 96TH, PRO XC
US PROXCT - Sea Otter Classic -  71ST, PRO XC
US Cup #3 - Sage Brush Safari - 31st, PRO XC
US Cup #2 - Fontana City National - 88th, PRO XC
US Cup #1 - Bonelli Park - 30th, Pro XC

References 

1983 births
Living people
American male cyclists
Sportspeople from Sioux City, Iowa
American mountain bikers